Castile or Castille is a territory of imprecise limits located in Spain. The invention of the concept of Castile relies on the assimilation (via a metonymy) of a 19th-century determinist geographical notion, that of Castile as Spain's  ("tableland core", connected to the Meseta Central) with a long-gone historical entity of diachronically variable territorial extension (the Kingdom of Castile).

The proposals advocating for a particular semantic codification/closure of the concept (a dialogical construct) are connected to essentialist arguments relying on the reification of something that does not exist beyond the social action of those building Castile not only by identifying with it as a homeland of any kind, but also in opposition to it. A hot topic concerning the concept of Castile is its relation with Spain, insofar intellectuals, politicians, writers, or historians have either endorsed, nuanced or rejected the idea of the maternity of Spain by Castile, thereby permeating non-scholar discourses about Castile.

Castile's name is generally thought to derive from "land of castles" (castle in Spanish is castillo) in reference to the castles built in the area to consolidate the Christian Reconquest from the Moors.

The Encyclopedia Britannica ascribes the concept to the sum of the regions of Old Castile and New Castile, as they were formally defined in the 1833 territorial division of Spain.

History
Originally an eastern county of the kingdom of León, in the 11th century, Castile became an independent realm with its capital at Burgos. The County of Castile, which originally included most of Burgos and parts of Vizcaya, Álava, Cantabria and La Rioja, became the leading force in the northern Christian states' 800-year Reconquista ("reconquest") of central and southern Spain from the Moorish rulers who had dominated most of the peninsula since the early 8th century.

The capture of Toledo in 1085 added New Castile to the crown's territories, and the battle of Las Navas de Tolosa (1212) heralded the Moors' loss of most of southern Spain. The kingdom of León was integrated in the Crown of Castile in 1230, and the following decades saw the capture of Córdoba (1236), Murcia (1243) and Seville (1248). By the Treaty of Alcaçovas with Portugal on March 6, 1460, the ownership of the Canary Islands was transferred to Castile.

The dynastic union of Castile and Aragon in 1469, when Ferdinand II of Aragon wed Isabella I of Castile, would eventually lead to the formal creation of Spain as a single entity in 1516 when their grandson Charles V assumed both thrones. See List of Spanish monarchs and Kings of Spain family tree. The Muslim Kingdom of Granada (roughly encompassing the modern day provinces of Granada, Malaga and Almeria) was conquered in 1492, formally passing to the Crown of Castile in that year.

Geography

Since it lacks official recognition, Castile does not have clearly defined borders. Historically, the area consisted of the Kingdom of Castile. After the kingdom merged with its neighbours to become the Crown of Castile and later the Kingdom of Spain, when it united with the Crown of Aragon and the Kingdom of Navarre, the definition of what constituted Castile gradually began to change. Its historical capital was Burgos. In modern Spain, it is generally considered to comprise Castile and León and Castile–La Mancha, with Madrid as its centre. West Castile and León, Albacete, Cantabria and La Rioja are sometimes included in the definition (controversial for historical, political, and cultural reasons).

Since 1982 there have been two nominally Castilian autonomous communities in Spain, incorporating the toponym in their own official names: Castile and Leon and Castile-La Mancha. A third, the Community of Madrid is also regarded as part of Castile, by dint of its geographic enclosure within the entity and, above all, by the statements of its Statute of Autonomy, since its autonomic process originated in national interest and not in popular disaffection with Castile.

Other territories in the former Crown of Castile are left out for different reasons. The territory of the Castilian Crown actually comprised all other autonomous communities within Spain with the exception of Aragon, Balearic Islands, Valencia and Catalonia, all belonging to the former Crown of Aragon, and Navarre, offshoot of the older Kingdom of the same name. Castile was divided between Old Castile in the north, so called because it was where the Kingdom of Castile was founded, and New Castile, called the Kingdom of Toledo in the Middle Ages. The Leonese region, part of the Crown of Castile from 1230, was from medieval times considered a region in its own right on a par with the two Castiles, and appeared on maps alongside Old Castile until the two joined as one region - Castile and Leon - in the 1980s. In 1833, Spain was further subdivided into administrative provinces.

Two non-administrative, nominally Castilian regions existed from 1833 to 1982: Old Castile, including Santander (autonomous community of Cantabria since 1981), Burgos, Logroño (autonomous community of La Rioja since 1982), Palencia, Valladolid, Soria, Segovia and Ávila, and New Castile consisting of Madrid (autonomous community of Madrid since 1983), Guadalajara, Cuenca, Toledo and Ciudad Real.

Language
The language of Castile emerged as the primary language of Spain—known to many of its speakers as castellano and in English sometimes as Castilian, but generally as Spanish. See Names given to the Spanish language.
Historically, the Castilian Kingdom and people were considered to be the main architects of the Spanish State by a process of expansion to the South against the Moors and of marriages, wars, assimilation, and annexation of their smaller Eastern and Western neighbours. From the advent of the Bourbon Monarchy following the War of the Spanish Succession until the arrival of parliamentary democracy in 1977, the Castilian language was the only one with official status in the Spanish state.

Maps

See also
 Castilian people
 Early history of the Kingdom of León
 List of Castile Kings
 Heraldry of Castile
 New Castile
 Old Castile

References

External links
 El mapa de los límites de Castilla a lo largo de la historia 

 
Historical regions in Spain
Kingdom of Castile